Sir Demola Aladekomo (born 31 December 1957) is a computer engineer. Aladekomo is the chairman of SmartCity Resorts Plc, Card Centre Nigeria Limited, Treasure-nest Limited, Crops Nigeria Limited, Chams Consortium Limited, Insider Concepts Limited, and the founder of Chams Plc. He is a Fellow of the Nigeria Computer Society (FNCS) and the Computer Professional Registration Council (CPN); a member of the Nigerian Society of Engineers (NSE), and the immediate past President of the Lagos Business School Alumni Association (LBSAA) and the Nigeria Computer Society, respectively. Aladekomo has also served as the vice chairman of the Board of Trustees of SmartCard Society of Nigeria. He is the founder of DATA Foundation and Volunteer Corps, non-governmental organizations engaged in corporate social investments in Nigeria.

Early life and family 
Sir Aladekomo graduated from the University of Ife (now Obafemi Awolowo University) in 1982 with a degree in computer engineering and obtained an MBA from the University of Lagos in 1984. He was Chief Executive Programmer at the Lagos Business School (LBS) from 1991 to 1992. He is married to Titi Aladekomo, an entrepreneur and philanthropist. They have four children and three granddaughters.

Professional exploits 
Sir Aladekomo founded Chams Limited (now Chams Plc, and listed on the Nigerian Stock Exchange) as the first indigenous computer maintenance outfit in Nigeria in September 1985, almost 30 years ago. Working as the chief engineer, he led Company to deploy Nigeria's first Wide-Area-Network WAN) on personal computers, and to deploy the country's pioneer card technology. Sir Aladekomo is also acknowledged as the brain behind  the first e-payment card in Nigeria birthed by the Valucard project, working with a consortium of five indigenous banks.

Under his watch, Chams transformed from a privately held company to public company listed on the Nigerian Stock Exchange, differentiating itself in the Nigerian market by focusing on the business of identity management, ceding the increasingly cluttered card technology and transaction payments segments to its subsidiaries, ChamAccess Limited and Card Centre Nigeria Limited. Chams Plc is also the parent company of ChamsSwitch Limited, and ChamsConsortium Limited, and has a substantial interest in ChamsMobile.

Philanthropic activities 
Sir Aladekomo is the founder and past chairman of the Board of Trustees: Volunteer Corps, chairman, DATA Foundation;  a non-governmental organization committed to professional volunteerism for public school education. He established Volunteer Corps in 1992 out of the need to offer educational opportunities to less privileged members of society. He later founded DATA Foundation which has repeatedly awarded scholarships to students in public schools.

Sir Aladekomo served in the following capacities as listed below:

Council Member, Osun State University
Board Member, Osun State University Advancement Board
Board Member, Obafemi Awolowo University (OAUTECHEXCEL), the foundation implementing a knowledge park at the university
Patron, Lagos City Chorale Group
Member, Nigerian Economic Summit Group (NESG) from inception/Vision 2010 and Vision 2020
Founder: Admin

References

Computer engineers
Nigerian computer scientists
Nigerian engineers
Nigerian philanthropists
Nigerian business executives
Obafemi Awolowo University alumni
1957 births
Living people
Nigerian company founders
Yoruba businesspeople
Yoruba engineers
University of Lagos alumni
Lagos Business School alumni
Yoruba philanthropists
20th-century Nigerian businesspeople
21st-century Nigerian businesspeople
Nigerian chairpersons of corporations